Taylor Anderson (born February 25, 1995) is an American curler from Minneapolis, Minnesota. Along with her twin sister Sarah, she was United States National Champion in 2019 and World Junior silver medalist in 2016.

Curling career

Juniors
Anderson was a member of Team USA at the 2012 Winter Youth Olympics, playing lead on the team, which was skipped by Korey Dropkin. They finished in fifth place. In the mixed doubles event, Anderson was paired with Great Britain's Duncan Menzies. The pair were eliminated in the quarterfinals.

Anderson was the alternate for Team USA (skipped by Cory Christensen) at the 2015 World Junior Curling Championships. The team finished in 5th place, and Anderson played in two games. The next season, Anderson was promoted to second on the team. The team represented the United States at the 2016 World Junior Curling Championships, where they made it all the way to the gold medal final, where they lost to Canada.

Women's
Anderson made her debut at the United States Women's Curling Championship in 2013 playing lead for her twin sister Sarah's team. The team finished the event with a 2–7 record. Anderson played in the 2014 United States Women's Curling Championship playing second for her sister. The team finished with a 4–5 record.

In 2014, the Anderson twins joined the Christensen rink to play in both juniors and women's events. The team won a World Curling Tour (WCT) event in their first season, the 2014 Molson Cash Spiel. The team played in the 2015 United States Women's Curling Championship, finishing fourth. The next season the team won another WCT event, the 2015 St. Paul Cash Spiel. Later that season, they finished third at the 2016 United States Women's Curling Championship. The team won the St. Paul Cash Spiel again in 2016 and finished fifth at the 2017 United States Women's Curling Championship. In their last season together, the team finished 2nd at the 2018 United States Women's Curling Championship and was also one of three invited to the 2017 United States Olympic Curling Trials, where they finished last with just one win.

After the 2017–18 season, both Taylor and Sarah Anderson joined the Jamie Sinclair rink.  In their first year together, the team won the 2019 United States Women's Curling Championship and represented the U.S. at the 2019 World Women's Curling Championship, finishing with a 6–6 record.

Personal life
Anderson attended the University of Minnesota. She currently lives in Minneapolis. She works as a "Lululemon educator".

Teams

Women's

Mixed doubles

References

External links

Living people
1995 births
American female curlers
Curlers at the 2012 Winter Youth Olympics
Sportspeople from Philadelphia
Sportspeople from Minneapolis
University of Minnesota alumni
Continental Cup of Curling participants
Twin sportspeople
American curling champions
21st-century American women